Campi may refer to:

People

Campi was a family of painters, distinguished in the annals of Italian art at Cremona in the 16th century. Some members are:
Antonio Campi (Cavaliere) (1536 - c. 1591), Italian painter; brother and student of Giulio Campi
Galeazzo Campi (1477 - 1536), Italian painter 
Giulio Campi (1502 - 1572), Italian painter
Pier Paolo Campi (1668 - 1764), Italian sculptor
Vincenzo Campi (1536 - 1591), Italian painter; brother and student of Giulio Campi
Also:
 Marji Campi, English actress
 Martín Campilongo, Argentine humourist known as "Campi"

Places

 Campi, Haute-Corse, a commune of the Haute-Corse département in France
 Campi (Norcia), a frazione of Norcia, province of Perugia, Umbria, Italy
 Campi Flegrei, volcanic area near Naples

Other uses
 Campi, a nonstandard plural form of campus